Keith Shevlin (born 11 November 1981) is an Irish professional Association Football player who plays in the position of forward.

Shevlin was a trainee at his hometown club Athlone Town. He made his first-team debut as a 16-year-old substitute
on 17 April 1997. Shevlin then went on to sign for Shamrock Rovers in the Eircom League of Ireland Premier division before going to America on a football Scholarship. He went on to play three years at the University of North Carolina Wilmington. His performances for the Seahawks gained international recognition when he was drafted into the Irish Squad for the Universiade tournament in Izmir, Turkey.

Shevlin began his appearance on the world's stage in fine form scoring against Russia in the first match of the group. The Irish squad followed with matches against Japan, Thailand, and Iran, where Shevlin was again amongst
the goal scorers. His performances on the world stage attracted interest from various clubs. The 5' 11", 175-pound Shevlin began the summer on tour with Dunfermline FC of the Scottish Premier League before joining Dundee FC of the 1st Division, where he continued his goal scoring form. He also had a spell with Clyde F.C.

Shevlin left Scotland and returned home to sign a professional contract with Cork City F.C, the defending champion of the Eircom League's Premier Division. Shevlin currently plays in Australia, with Marconi Stallions in the New South Wales Premier League.

Honours

 FAI Cup
 Cork City F.C. 2007

References

1981 births
Living people
Republic of Ireland association footballers
People from Athlone
Sportspeople from County Westmeath
Shamrock Rovers F.C. players
UNC Wilmington Seahawks men's soccer players
Clyde F.C. players
Dundee F.C. players
Cork City F.C. players
Marconi Stallions FC players
League of Ireland players
Scottish Football League players
National Premier Leagues players
Association football forwards